Tol-e Kuchak Khiarkar (also Romanized as Tol-e Kūchak Khīārkār; also known as Tol-e Kūchak) is a village in Dehdasht-e Sharqi Rural District, in the Central District of Kohgiluyeh County, Kohgiluyeh and Boyer-Ahmad Province, Iran. At the 2006 census, its population was 214, in 35 families.

References 

Populated places in Kohgiluyeh County